Garbure is a thick French stew traditionally based on cabbage and confit d'oie, though the modern version is usually made with ham, cheese and stale bread. The name derives from the use of the term garb to describe sheaves of grain depicted on a heraldic shield or coat of arms. Thus the name of garbure, which is eaten with a fork, is a reference to the use of pitchforks to pick up sheaves of grain.  It originated in Gascony in the historical cultural region of Occitania.  It is similar to potée.

Garbure was the daily sustenance of Gascon peasantry. It varied from home to home, resources of the cook, household income, and rhythms of the seasons. The dish is based on lengthy simmering of an assortment of vegetables and meats, generally meats preserved en confit.  The essential cabbage may be accompanied by broad beans, fresh or dried, mangetout peas, potatoes, turnips, peas, onions, carrots, celeriac, kohlrabi, beets, lettuce, nettles, borage, or even chestnuts. 

A large tureen of garbure is often presented to the table in Bearnais restaurants at the start of the meal, and guests can help themselves to as much as they wish.

Frequently the meal would end with a traditional chabrot, which is a custom of mixing half a glass of red wine in with the liquid left in the bottom of one's bowl after eating the solid contents, and then consuming it.

See also 
 List of bread dishes
 List of French soups and stews
 List of soups
 List of stews
 Potée

References 

French soups
Occitan cuisine
Spanish soups and stews
Bread soups